This is a list of episodes from the anime Cardfight!! Vanguard. In July 2010, an anime television series based on the game was green-lit by TMS Entertainment under the directorial supervision of Hatsuki Tsuji. Music is composed by Takayuki Negishi while Mari Tominaga provided the character designs. The series began airing in Japan on TV Aichi beginning on January 8, 2011 and rebroadcast by AT-X, TV Tokyo, TV Osaka, and TV Setouchi systems.  The media-streaming website Crunchyroll simulcasted the first season to the United States, Canada, the United Kingdom, and Ireland. Crunchyroll began streaming the second season to the United States, Canada, and the United Kingdom on June 30, 2012.

Twenty-five pieces of theme music are used for the series—nine opening themes and seventeen closing themes (one of which is exclusive to the English dub). The anime also features two insert songs performed by Ultra Rare (i.e. Albert Luu, Yoshino Nanjō, and Aimi Terakawa, who are the original Japanese voice actresses of Kourin, Rekka, and Suiko). The two songs are "Miracle Trigger ~Tomorrow Will Be Ultra Rare!~" (ミラクルトリガー ~きっと明日はウルトラレア!~) (used in episodes 18, 26, and 115; simply known as "Miracle Trigger" in the English dub) and "Stand Up! DREAM" (スタンドアップ! DREAM) (used in episodes 39, 115, and 118).

An English dub co-produced by Ocean Productions (recorded at Blue Water Studios) began airing on Singapore's Okto channel from October 16, 2011, on Animax Asia from January 22, 2012, and on Malaysia's RTM-TV2 channel from November 18, 2012. Dubbed episodes also began being released on YouTube from May 29, 2012. The series can be seen legally on a dedicated channel for it created by Bushiroad, the original creators and manufacturers of the card game, and as of June 25 is available for viewing in most countries without geo-blocking.

While there are a few changes, the English dub adaption is mostly faithful to the original Japanese version. However, the most notable change in the English dub is that three opening themes and three ending themes are used. The only openings are English versions of the first opening theme "Vanguard" (from eps. 1-65), the third opening theme "Limit Break" (from eps. 66-104), and the fourth opening theme "Vanguard Fight" (from eps. 105 onward), all of which are still performed by their original respective artists.

The first ending theme used in the dub is an English version of the third ending theme "Dream Shooter" (from eps. 1-65) while the second ending theme is a unique song titled "Way To Victory" (from eps. 66-104), both of which are performed by Sea☆A. The ending credit sequence for this exclusive theme is the one used for the original sixth ending theme "Jōnetsu-ism". The third ending theme used in the dub is an English version of the original ninth ending song "Endless☆Fighter" (from eps. 105 onward), which is performed only by Aimi Terakawa in the dub. Similarly, the Ultra Rare insert songs are performed in English by Suzuko Mimori, Yoshino Nanjō, and Aimi Terakawa (the original Japanese voice actresses of Kourin, Rekka, and Suiko).

Individual episodes from seasons 1-5 are known as "Rides", and the episodes from Cardfight!! Vanguard G are known as "Turns".

Series overview

Generation 1 (2011-2014)

Cardfight!! Vanguard G (Generation 2)

Cardfight!! Vanguard seasons

Season 1: Cardfight!! Vanguard (2011–2012)

Season 2: Cardfight!! Vanguard: Asia Circuit (2012–2013)

Season 3: Cardfight!! Vanguard: Link Joker (2013–2014)

Season 4: Cardfight!! Vanguard: Legion Mate (2014)

Cardfight!! Vanguard G seasons

Cardfight!! Vanguard G (2014–2015)

Cardfight!! Vanguard G: GIRS Crisis (2015–2016)

Cardfight!! Vanguard G: Stride Gate (2016)

Cardfight!! Vanguard G: NEXT (2016–2017)

Cardfight!! Vanguard G: Z (2017-2018)

Cardfight!! Vanguard 2018 reboot series

Cardfight!! Vanguard (2018–2019)

Cardfight!! Vanguard: High School Arc Cont. (2019)

Cardfight!! Vanguard (Shinemon Arc) (2019–2020)

Cardfight!! Vanguard (Gaiden if Arc) (2020)

Mini Vanguard series 
It is based on the spin-off yonkoma manga series of the same name by Quily. Some of the episodes do not have titles.

Ending theme
 "Mirai Sketch" by Ultra Rare (Mimori, Nanjō, and Terakawa)

Mini Vanguard OVA
An original video animation episode was released with the first DVD release of Mini Vanguard.

References

Cardfight!! Vanguard
Cardfight!! Vanguard